Frederik Rung  (June 14, 1854 - January 22, 1914) was a Danish conductor and composer.

Biography
He was the son of composer Henrik Rung (1807-1871). His sister Sophie Keller (1850–1929) was an opera singer at the Royal Danish Theatre. His son  P. S. Rung-Keller (1879-1966) was also an organist and composer.

He studied 1867-70 at the Royal Danish Academy of Music  under Johan Peter Emilius Hartmann and Niels Gade.
from 1881 to 1893, he was a  piano teacher at the Conservatory of Music.
In 1877, he became conductor  of the special Madrigal choir at  the Cecilia Association (Caeciliaforening)  of Copenhagen. 
From 1884  until his death in 1914, he was a conductor of the Royal Danish Orchestra.

Works, editions and recordings
 Songs and guitar pieces on Roser og Kjerlighed: Inspired by Norway with songs by his father Henrik Rung. Singers Helene Wold, Per Andreas Tønder, Vegard Lund guitar, piano Eugene Asti. Lawo 2011.
 Fogli d'album, performed by Alberto La Rocca (10-string guitar), CD GuitArt 10/2015. Contains: La melanconia; Praeludium; Dans; Berceuse; Humoreske; Romance; Gavotte; Idyl; Capriccio; Pastorale.

See also
List of Danish composers

References

This article was initially translated from the Danish Wikipedia.

External links

Danish composers
Male composers
1854 births
1914 deaths